The men's artistic single free skating event at the 2010 Asian Games was held in Guangzhou Velodrome, Guangzhou, China on 25 November and 26 November.

Schedule
All times are China Standard Time (UTC+08:00)

Results

References

Roller Sports Results Book Pages 11–15

Roller sports at the 2010 Asian Games